Shyama was an Indian actress of Malayalam movies. She was one of the prominent lead and supporting actress of Malayalam and Tamil movies during 1990s. She came into movie industry as a child artist and later started doing lead roles and supporting roles.

Death

She died of a gas cylinder explosion at her home in 1996. She was a distant relative of Parvathy Jayaram.

Filmography

References

External links

Actresses in Tamil cinema
Actresses from Thiruvananthapuram
Actresses in Malayalam cinema
Indian film actresses
Year of birth missing
1993 deaths
20th-century Indian actresses
Child actresses in Malayalam cinema